Donald Jerome Hodge (born February 25, 1969) is a retired American professional basketball player.

Professional career
Born in Washington, D.C., Hodge began his sports career as a stellar athlete at Coolidge High School in and later played college basketball at Temple University. He was selected by the Dallas Mavericks in the 2nd round (33rd overall) of the 1991 NBA Draft and would go on to average 4.7 ppg in 5 NBA seasons. He played mainly for the Mavericks, where he was a fan favorite, but had a stint with the Charlotte Hornets. He later landed in Europe to play with the Belgium-based Power Wevelgem basketball club.

References

External links
College & NBA stats @ basketballreference.com

1969 births
Living people
African-American basketball players
American expatriate basketball people in Belgium
American men's basketball players
Basketball players from Washington, D.C.
Centers (basketball)
Charlotte Hornets players
Dallas Mavericks draft picks
Dallas Mavericks players
McDonald's High School All-Americans
Parade High School All-Americans (boys' basketball)
Power forwards (basketball)
Temple Owls men's basketball players
21st-century African-American people
20th-century African-American sportspeople